HMS LST-409 was a Landing Ship, Tank Mk.2 of the  Royal Navy during World War II.

The ship was never named, but referred to by her hull designation.

Construction
LST-409 was laid down on 9 September 1942, under Maritime Commission (MARCOM) contract, MC hull 929, by the Bethlehem-Fairfield Shipyard, Baltimore, Maryland; launched 15 November 1942; then transferred to the United Kingdom and commissioned on 6 January 1943.

Service history 
LST-409 saw no active service in the United States Navy. The tank landing ship was decommissioned and returned to United States Navy custody on 2 July 1946, and struck from the Navy list on 29 October, that same year. Sometime between 21 November 1946 and 6 January 1947, LST-409 was sold to Greece.

See also 
 List of United States Navy LSTs

Notes 

Citations

Bibliography 

Online resources

External links

 

Ships built in Baltimore
1942 ships
LST-1-class tank landing ships of the Royal Navy
World War II amphibious warfare vessels of the United Kingdom
S3-M2-K2 ships